Colin Shaw (born 10 May 1983 in Irvine, Scotland) is a former Scotland 7s international rugby union player who played on the wing and Full Back for Glasgow Warriors.

Rugby union career

Amateur career

He played for Ayr RFC at the start of his rugby career.

He then played for Glasgow Hawks winning 3 league and 1 cup in his 3 years before breaking into the Warriors team in 2003.

He won the Melrose Sevens in 2008 playing for the Scottish Thistles.

Professional career

He was part of the Glasgow Thistles squad - Glasgow district's Academy side - which went to New Zealand for rugby training in the summer of 2000.

He scored a try on his Warriors debut against Gloucester in the pre-season match in 2003. He made his competitive debut in the Celtic League against Cardiff Blues in 2004 and he was offered a full-time contract with the Warriors in 2005.

International career

Shaw played for Scotland U19s in the world U-19 championship in Italy in 2002 and for the Scotland U21s in the U-21 World Cup in England in 2003. He made two caps for Scotland 'A'.

Having made his debut for Scotland 7s in 2008 at the George 7s in South Africa, after playing in 36 tournaments on the IRB World Sevens Circuit, Shaw announced his retirement in 2015.

References

External links
SRU player profile

1983 births
Living people
Glasgow Warriors players
Ayr RFC players
Glasgow Hawks players
Scotland international rugby sevens players
Scotland 'A' international rugby union players
Male rugby sevens players